Code Mystics is a Canadian video game developer specializing in both the emulation and remastering of older video games for modern systems, and porting of indie titles.

History
Code Mystics was founded in 2009 by Jeff Vavasour. Prior to this, Vavasour served as CTO of Digital Eclipse Software from 1994 and founded the company's second studio in Vancouver in 1997; Digital Eclipse's focus was on emulation of old arcade games for modern hardware. Digital Eclipse Software merged with ImaginEngine in 2003 to become Backbone Entertainment, which later merged with several other small developers to form Foundation 9 Entertainment in 2005, which Vavasour served on as executive vice president for Canadian Operations. In 2006, Vavasour left Foundation 9 to become a consultant in the industry, but later sought to form Code Mystics, inviting former employees from Digital Eclipse to join him to continue to develop modern emulations of classic software title.

After some digital releases in 2009 including web-based Atari arcade games and a DSiWare version of Dragon's Lair, Code Mystics' first-released boxed title was Atari's Greatest Hits Volume I for the Nintendo DS, released in 2010. It subsequently has developed titles for PlayStation 3, PlayStation 4, Xbox One, Nintendo Switch, PlayStation Vita, Microsoft Windows, Mac, Linux, iOS, Android, TV Games, and HTML5.

References

External links
 

Video game development companies
Video game companies of Canada
Privately held companies of Canada
Companies based in Vancouver
Video game companies established in 2009
Canadian companies established in 2009
2009 establishments in British Columbia